The Dominion Post is a metropolitan daily newspaper published in Wellington, New Zealand. It is owned by media business Stuff Ltd, formerly the New Zealand branch of Australian media company Fairfax Media. Weekday issues are now in tabloid format, and its Saturday edition is in broadsheet format.

Since 2020 the editor has been Anna Fifield.

History 
The Dominion Post was created in July 2002 when Independent Newspapers Limited (INL) amalgamated two Wellington printed and published metropolitan broadsheet newspapers, The Evening Post, an evening paper first published on 8 February 1865, and The Dominion, a morning paper first published on Dominion Day, 26 September 1907.

The Dominion was distributed throughout the lower half of the North Island, as far as Taupo, where it met with Auckland's ambitiously named The New Zealand Herald. The Evening Post was not so widely distributed, but had a much greater circulation than The Dominion.

INL sold The Dominion Post and all other New Zealand newspapers and most magazines in its catalogue to Fairfax Media in 2003.

The Dominion Post is the only pay-and-read local newspaper in Wellington City. It is printed in Petone, Lower Hutt.

Editors
Richard Long had been the editor of The Dominion for ten years and was appointed the inaugural editor for The Dominion Post, but resigned shortly after the newspaper merger. Tim Pankhurst joined The Dominion Post shortly after it was founded to take over from Long. He resigned in February 2009 to head the New Zealand Press Association. Bernadette Courtney, who had previously been assistant editor at The Dominion Post and had gone to become editor of the Manawatu Standard, was appointed to replace Pankhurst. Courtney started in a national role for Stuff in 2018 and was replaced by Eric Janssen.

Anna Fifield was appointed editor October 2020 after Janssen's departure. She left in December 2022. The new editor Caitlin Cherry will take over in February 2023.

The following table lists the editors of The Dominion Post:

Awards and nominations received

Awards and nominations for journalists employed by The Dominion Post

References

External links
 The Dominion Post homepage at stuff.co.nz
 

Newspapers published in New Zealand
Mass media in Wellington
2002 establishments in New Zealand
Newspapers established in 2002